Lars Elisæus Vatnaland (18 April 1892 – 9 March 1983) is a Norwegian politician for the Farmer's Party.

He was elected to the Norwegian Parliament from Rogaland in 1945, and was re-elected on three occasions. He had previously served in the position of deputy representative during the terms 1934–1936 and 1937–1945.

Vatnaland was born in Bokn and served as mayor of Bokn municipality council from 1925 to 1934, and deputy mayor in 1937–1941 and 1945. He was also a member of Rogaland county council from 1925 to 1934.

References

1892 births
1983 deaths
Members of the Storting
Centre Party (Norway) politicians
20th-century Norwegian politicians
People from Bokn